The Jinbei S30 or Jinbei Zhishang S30 (金杯 智尚S30) is a subcompact crossover SUV manufactured by Jinbei in China.

Overview 

The Jinbei S30 is Jinbei's first entry into the passenger vehicle market with most of its previous products being commercial vans and trucks. Prices of the Jinbei S30 ranges from 49,800 to 72,800 yuan.

Powertrain 
The Jinbei S30 is powered by a 1.5 liter inline-4 engine developing 102 hp mated to a 5-speed manual transmission or a 5-speed automatic transmission.

Jinbei S35 

The Jinbei S35 or Jinbei Zhishang S35 debuted during the 2015 Chengdu Auto Show in China. The Jinbei S35 is an upmarket variant of the Brilliance Jinbei S30 launched in 2012, featuring a redesigned front fascia and tail lamps. Prices of the Jinbei S35 ranges from 59,800 to 78,800 yuan.

References

External links 

Jinbei Official website

2010s cars
Crossover sport utility vehicles
Front-wheel-drive vehicles
Hatchbacks
S30
Cars introduced in 2012